This is a list of Toledo Rockets football players in the NFL Draft.

Key

Selections

References

Toledo
Toledo Rockets NFL Draft